The TVB Anniversary Award for Best Actress in a Leading Role is one of the TVB Anniversary Awards presented annually by Television Broadcasts Limited (TVB) to recognize an actress who has delivered an outstanding performance in Hong Kong television dramas throughout the designated year. This award is usually reserved to be one of the last awards presented, and is one of the most premier and publicized awards of the ceremony. An actress who wins Best Actress is referred to as the TV Queen (視后). The leading contenders of the award, or those who reach the top 5 during nomination, are generally actresses currently considered as the fadans of TVB.

Since its institution in 1997, the award has changed names several times. It was first called the Best Performance by an Actress in a Drama (最佳劇中女角演繹大獎) in 1997, but was changed to Best Actress in a Leading Role (最佳女主角) in 1998. In 1999, the name was changed to My Favourite Leading Actress of the Year (本年度我最喜愛的女主角). The name was changed back to "Best Actress in a Leading Role" in 2005.

Winners and nominees
TVB nominates at least ten actresses for the category each year. The following table lists only the actresses who have made it to the top five nominations during the designated awards ceremony.

1990s

2000s

2010s

2020s

Records

Most wins

Most top 5 nominations

Age superlatives

External links
Anniversary Awards  myTV SUPER

Television awards for Best Actress
TVB Anniversary Awards